In the Long Ago is a 1913 silent film short directed by Colin Campbell. It was produced by the Selig Polyscope company and released by the General Film Company. Alternately the film is called The Long Ago.

Cast
Wheeler Oakman - Dreamer, the Indian Lover/The Modern Lover
Bessie Eyton - Starlight, the Indian Maiden/Miss Bartlett, the Modern Sweetheart
Frank Clark - Starlight's Father/Henry Bartlett, the Modern Girl's Father
Tom Santschi - The Indian Warrior
Henry Otto - The Medicine Man
William Hutchison - The Curator of the Museum

References

External links
 In the Long Ago at IMDb.com

1913 short films
Selig Polyscope Company films
American black-and-white films
American silent short films
Silent American comedy films
1913 comedy films
1913 films
Films directed by Colin Campbell
1910s American films
1910s English-language films